Beaupuy is the name of the following communes in France:

 Beaupuy, Gers
 Beaupuy, Haute-Garonne
 Beaupuy, Lot-et-Garonne
 Beaupuy, Tarn-et-Garonne